Vincenzo Natali (born 1969) is an American-born Canadian film director and screenwriter, known for writing and directing science fiction and horror films such as Cube, Cypher, Nothing, and Splice.

Early life and education
Natali was born in Detroit, to a nursery school teacher/painter mother and a photographer father. He is of Italian and English descent. He moved to Toronto, along with his family, at the age of one. During his time at Royal St. George's College, Natali befriended British-born Canadian actor David Hewlett, who has appeared in the majority of films that Natali has directed. Natali also attended the film programme at Ryerson Polytechnical Institute. He was eventually hired as a storyboard artist at the Nelvana Animation Studios. His cinematic influences included Samuel Beckett, David Cronenberg, and Terry Gilliam.

Career
Natali's directing debut came in 1997, when he directed Cube which he also co-wrote. The film became a success worldwide, especially in Japan and France, grossing $15 million in the latter country, and breaking box office records for a Canadian film. At the 19th Genie Awards, the film received five nominations, and also won the award for Best Canadian First Feature at the Toronto International Film Festival. After this success, Natali went on to direct Cypher (2002) and Nothing (2003).

Following the June 2010 release of Splice (2009), Natali's next efforts were expected to be an adaptation of J. G. Ballard's 1975 novel High Rise and a 3D adaptation of the Len Wein/Berni Wrightson comic book character Swamp Thing, for producer Joel Silver. A May 2010 item in The Hollywood Reporter, however, announced that Natali was to replace Joseph Kahn as director of the highly anticipated adaptation of cyberpunk author William Gibson's 1984 novel Neuromancer.

Natali was nominated for the 4th Annual Splatcademy Awards under the category "Best Director" presented by Cadaver Lab for his work Splice. In 2013 his series Darknet, an adaptation of the Japanese series Tori Hada, began airing on Super Channel in Canada. In 2014, he directed the episodes "Su-zakana" and "Naka-choko" of the second season of the crime drama series Hannibal and in 2015 the episodes "Antipasto", "Primavera" and "Secondo" of the third season of the same TV series. in 2015, he also directed the second episode (entitled "Simon") of the first season of the American supernatural drama television series The Returned. In 2016, he directed the fourth episode ("Dissonance Theory") of the HBO series Westworld. In 2017, he directed the fifth episode ("Lemon Scented You") of the Starz series American Gods.
He directed a pilot for a new Tremors TV series starring Kevin Bacon reprising his role from the 1990 film but it was not picked up by SyFy as a series.

A television adaptation of William Gibson's The Peripheral was put into development in April 2018 by Amazon, with Natali among the executive producers. Natali directed the show's pilot.

He has directed the last 2 episodes of the first season for the Locke & Key TV series, distributed by Netflix.

Filmography
Feature films

Short films

Documentary

Television

References

External links

Podcast interview with Vincenzo Natali about Splice (daily.greencine.com)

1969 births
20th-century Canadian screenwriters
20th-century Canadian male writers
21st-century Canadian screenwriters
21st-century Canadian male writers
Canadian male screenwriters
Living people
English-language film directors
Writers from Detroit
Toronto Metropolitan University alumni
Naturalized citizens of Canada
Canadian people of Italian descent
Canadian people of English descent
Canadian storyboard artists
American emigrants to Canada
Horror film directors
Science fiction film directors
Film directors from Michigan
Film directors from Toronto
Writers from Toronto
Canadian Film Centre alumni